Pontogeneiidae is a family of amphipod crustaceans, containing the following genera:

Abdia Barnard & Karaman, 1987
Accedomoera J. L. Barnard, 1964
Antarctogeneia Thurston, 1974
Atyloella Schellenberg, 1929
Awacaris Uéno, 1971
Bathyschraderia Dahl, 1959
Bovallia Pfeffer, 1888
Dautzenbergia Chevreux, 1900
Djerboa Chevreux, 1906
Eurymera Pfeffer, 1888
Eusiroides Stebbing, 1888
Gondogeneia J. L. Barnard, 1972
Haliogeneia Lowry & Stoddart, 1998
Inhaca Ortiz, Berze-Freire & Wasikete, 1990
Liouvillea Chevreux, 1911
Luckia Bellan-Santini & Thurston, 1996
Nasageneia Barnard & Karaman, 1987
Paramoera Miers, 1875
Paramoerella Ruffo, 1974
Pleusiroides Ortiz, Lalana & Varela, 2007
Pontogeneia Boeck, 1871
Prostebbingia Schellenberg, 1926
Pseudomoera Schellenberg, 1929
Pseudopontogeneia Oldevig, 1959
Relictomoera Barnard & Karaman, 1991
Ronco J. L. Barnard, 1965
Rozinante Stebbing, 1894
Schraderia Pfeffer, 1888
Sennaia Bellan-Santini, 1997
Sternomoera Barnard & Karaman, 1991
Tethygeneia J. L. Barnard, 1972

See also
Schraderia mardeni

References

Gammaridea
Crustacean families